Ashley Malcolm Morrison is an Australian/ British sports commentator, broadcaster, writer, and documentary filmmaker.

Early life
Born in Salisbury, Wiltshire, he grew up in Purton, near Swindon. He was educated at Stowe School, Buckingham and played cricket for Wiltshire.

Career
On moving to Australia, Morrison worked for Impact Publications and was later Cargo Manager Australia & New Zealand for South African Airways.

In 2008 he set up his own media business, Ashley Morrison Media.

Broadcast work
Morrison has appeared on radio in Perth since 1991, first with 6NR covering the Perth Glory games in the National Soccer League, before moving to 6PR, where he also covered rugby. With the start of the Hyundai A league in 2004 he moved to 6RPH, which broadcast the A League as well as the first season of the Western Force in Super Rugby.

In September 2006 he launched Not The Footy Show, a two-hour radio show that focussed on all sports except AFL, with co-host Darren Harper. It later became a regular podcast with co-host John Lee.

Morrison was part of the Fox Sports Australia A League coverage from 2006 to 2011. He has commentated sport for, among others, BT Sport, Star Sports, Astro Arena, Neo Sports, and the FIH. In hockey his coverage includes the Sultan Azlan Shah Cup, the Asia Cup, the Junior Asia Cup, Hockey World League, Australian Hockey League finals in 2017, and three editions of the Hockey India League. He has also commentated at multi-sport events such as the 2018 Asian Games, Southeast Asian Games and the Asian Indoor and Martial Arts Games, as well as association football for One World Sports and the World Sports Group. Other sports that Morrison has commentated are badminton, boxing, floorball, futsal, gymnastics, water polo, Kabaddi and rugby union.

Documentaries

Standing at the Touchlines
In 2010 Morrison produced and directed his first documentary film, Standing at the Touchlines. It is a journey through Africa during the 2010 FIFA World Cup that shows not only how football has played such a key role in so many African communities, but also to look at whether the World Cup would in fact unite a continent, as then President of South Africa Thabo Mbeki had said it would. The film travels through Ghana, Nigeria, Cameroon, Uganda, Kenya, Zanzibar, Lesotho during the competition, finishing in host nation South Africa.

It aired in Africa and Asia and was part of the African World Documentary Film Festival, screening in Jamaica, Cameroon, Nigeria and South Africa, where it won an Audience Choice award.

No Apologies
In 2012 he produced and directed No Apologies, a film about two young Aboriginal women, Kyah Simon and Lydia Williams, representing Australia at the Women's World Cup in Germany in 2011.

No Apologies won the award for Best Editing in a Documentary and Best Documentary at the Southampton International Film Festival. It also won an Award of Excellence and three Honourable Mentions awards at the International Film Festival for Health Environment and Culture and the International Film Festival for Peace Inspiration and Equality.

Mark Our Place
In 2019 he produced and directed the documentary Mark Our Place, the story of three rugby players who all played for the same club in Dublin, Wanderers, who went on to represent Ireland, and who were all awarded the Victoria Cross. Their names were Robert Johnston, Thomas Crean and Frederick Harvey.

Publications
Morrison has written several books:
Headingley Remembered: A Century of Ashes Cricket
 Please Sir Can I Have My Ball Back – about his battle with testicular cancer
The Professor: The Azumah Nelson Story –biography of three-time World Champion boxer Azumah Nelson
Australia's Hockey Grail – about the Australian men's hockey team and their quest for Olympic Gold
Into The Nest: The Story Behind WASPS Hockey Club

References

English documentary filmmakers
English non-fiction writers
English sports journalists
English broadcasters
Living people
People from Salisbury
English male non-fiction writers
Year of birth missing (living people)
People educated at Stowe School